Callidrepana ovata is a moth in the family Drepanidae first described by Watson in 1968. It is found in the Chinese provinces of Shaanxi, Hubei and Sichuan.

The length of the forewings is 15.5–19 mm for males and 17.5–22 mm for females. Adults are similar to the pale form of Callidrepana patrana palleolus, but usually paler. There are scattered brilliantly lustrous scales along the veins proximal to the postmedial fascia, along the distal edge of the postmedial fascia and in a streak in the basal half of the costal area.

References

Moths described in 1968
Drepaninae